Images was a French pop band that existed from 1986 to 1999 and then burst into the formation Émile et Images. The founders, Mario Ramsamy, Jean-Louis Pujade and Richard Seff; came from Toulouse, Occitania. Their biggest hit was "Les Démons de minuit" (1986), which was 13 weeks at number 1 on the charts in France.

Discography

Singles 
 1986 - Les Démons de minuit (#1 France, #31 Belgium (Flanders)) 
 1986 - Love Emotion (English version of Les Démons de Minuit)
 1987 - Corps à corps (#4 France)
 1987 - Le coeur en exil (#6 France)
 1988 - Maîtresse (#6 France)
 1988 - Quand la musique tourne (#23 France)
 1988 - L'enfant des rizières
 1989 - Soleil
 1990 - Danger d'amour
 1990 - Nasty
 1993 - Rendez-nous nos rêves
 1993 - Sauvez l'amour (von Daniel Balavoine)
 1995 - Megamix
 1996 - Les démons de minuit 
 2000 - Mon ange

Albums 
 1987 - L'album d'Images 
 1990 - Le sens du rythme 
 1993 - Rendez-nous nos rêves
 1994 - Collection légende
 1995 - Le meilleur d'Images
 1995 - Les inoubliables
 1996 - The very best of
 1997 - Soleil d'argile
 2001 - Best of

References

Musical groups from Occitania (administrative region)
Musical groups established in 1986